The 1984 season was Daewoo Royals' second season in the Korean Super League in South Korea. Daewoo Royals competed in League.

Players

Squad

Squad stats

Competition

Korean Super League

First stage

Second stage

Championship playoffs
First Leg

Second Leg

Matches

Source : K-League
KSL : Korean Super League
1Daewoo Royals goals come first.

References

1984
Daewoo
1984 in South Korean football